Doddycross is a small hamlet at a crossroads in the former Caradon district of southeast Cornwall, England, UK, with a population of <50. There are 14 houses. The hamlet is approximately 16 miles (27 km) west of the city of Plymouth, six miles (10 km) southeast of Liskeard, and 1.5 miles from the village of Menheniot. There is a public phone box and a postbox in the hamlet.

References

Hamlets in Cornwall